The Golden Kite Awards are given annually by the Society of Children's Book Writers and Illustrators, an international children's writing organization, to recognize excellence in children’s literature. The award is a golden medallion showing a child flying a kite. Instituted in 1973, the Golden Kite Awards are the only children’s literary award judged by a jury of peers.  Eligible books must be written or illustrated by SCBWI members, and submitted either by publishers or individuals.

The award currently recognizes literature in seven categories: "Young Reader and Middle Grade Fiction, Young Adult Fiction, Nonfiction Text for Young Readers, Nonfiction text for Older Readers, Picture Book Text,Picture Book Illustration, and Illustration for Older Readers."

Winners are chosen by a panel of judges consisting of children’s book writers and illustrators. In addition to the Golden Kite Award winners, honor book recipients are named by the judges. Since 2006, each category's winner wins a $2,500 grant cash prize, as well as $1,000 to donate to their chosen non-profit organization. Honor winners receive $500, as well as $250 to donate.

Since 2003, the Sid Fleischman Award for excellence in humorous writing is given in conjunction with the Golden Kite Awards.

Recipients
In the following table, the year represents the year the awards were given, which is the year following publication. For example, the 2000 awards are for books published in 1999.

References

External links

 

 
American children's literary awards
Awards established in 1973